Pekčanica is a village situated in Kraljevo municipality in central Serbia. As of 2011 census, it has a population of 219 inhabitants.

References

Populated places in Raška District